A normal plane may refer to
The plane perpendicular to the tangent vector of a space curve; see Frenet–Serret formulas.
One of the planes containing the normal vector of a surface; see Normal plane (geometry).
A term involving gears; see list of gear nomenclature.

See also
Normal bundle
Normal section